Victor Ivanovich Zinchuk (born April 8, 1958 in Moscow) is a Russian guitar virtuoso, composer, arranger, Honored Artist of Russia in 2005. Golden Guitar Russia.

References

External links
 Official Site

1958 births
Soviet composers
Soviet male composers
Russian composers
Russian male composers
Honored Artists of the Russian Federation
Russian guitarists
Russian male guitarists
Russian rock guitarists
Living people
20th-century Russian male musicians
20th-century guitarists
21st-century Russian male musicians
21st-century guitarists
Musicians from Moscow